Cristian Câmpean (born 22 April 2003) is a Romanian professional footballer who plays as a midfielder for Liga I side Gaz Metan Mediaș.

References

External links
 

2003 births
Living people
People from Mediaș
Romanian footballers
Association football midfielders
Liga I players
CS Gaz Metan Mediaș players